is a professional Japanese baseball player. He plays infielder for the Hokkaido Nippon-Ham Fighters.

External links

 NPB.com

1997 births
Living people
Baseball people from Okayama Prefecture
Japanese baseball players
Nihon University alumni
Nippon Professional Baseball infielders
Hokkaido Nippon-Ham Fighters players
People from Kurashiki